OREX (Orbital Re-entry Experiment) was a NASDA re-entry demonstrator prototype which was launched in 1994 on the H-II launcher; the satellite was renamed . It was a precursor for the Japanese space shuttle HOPE.

OREX tested various communications systems, heating profiles and heat shielding components for HOPE.

See also 
 ALFLEX
 HOPE-X
 HYFLEX

References

External links

Description of OREX on JAXA web site

Satellites of Japan
Spacecraft launched in 1994